Jamie Lauren Keiles (born 1992) is an American writer and journalist. They are currently a contributing writer for The New York Times Magazine and a lecturer at The New School.  They first gained attention as a teenage blogger in 2010 for "Seventeen Magazine Project," a blog chronicling their attempt to follow the advice of Seventeen Magazine for 30 days.

Early life
Jamie Keiles grew up in Doylestown, Pennsylvania, where they attended Central Bucks High School West.  They graduated from the University of Chicago in 2014 with a degree in interdisciplinary studies in the humanities.

Career
In April 2010, at age 18, Keiles launched "The Seventeen Magazine Project", a blog documenting their attempt to follow the advice of Seventeen Magazine for 30 days.
The project criticized Seventeen for promoting a limited conception of adolescent femininity; the project quickly drew coverage from feminist blogs as well as national outlets, including NPR's All Things Considered and CBC's Q, among others. Upon completion of "The Seventeen Magazine Project," Keiles initiated "Hey Mainstream Media", a photo submission project encouraging internet users to air their grievances with mainstream media through the use of handwritten signs. In July 2010, Keiles launched "Teenagerie". Though the site was initially founded as a means of challenging societal conceptions of adolescence, it has since expanded to cover a wide range of feminist issues.
In August 2010, Keiles was the subject of much criticism from the conservative blogging community for a critique they wrote on the public image of Taylor Swift. In September 2010, Keiles was listed as #7 on Woman's Day magazine's list of the eight most influential bloggers under 21, behind Bryanboy and Tavi Gevinson.

As an undergraduate at the University of Chicago, Keiles worked for the alternative newspaper the Chicago Weekly.

Since 2015, Keiles has been working as a full-time freelance writer and part-time lecturer. Their work has appeared in The New York Times, The New Yorker, Vox, and The Awl. They write about American culture, including subjects like Adam Sandler, the Jewish American princess stereotype, and Coca-Cola.

References

External links
Jamie Lauren Keiles in The New York Times Magazine

1992 births
American bloggers
American feminists
20th-century American Jews
Feminist bloggers
Jewish feminists
Living people
People from Doylestown, Pennsylvania
University of Chicago alumni
21st-century American writers
21st-century American Jews